St. Dominic's College is a private, traditionalist Catholic secondary school, located in Gonville, Parish of St. Anthony's & St. Edmund's Catholic Church, Whanganui, New Zealand. The school was founded in 1994 by the Society of Saint Pius X. The school is divided into two campuses (St. Augustine's Boys' College and St. Dominic's Girls) both situated in Gonville.

Overview 
Students at St Dominic's College are examined under the CIE (Cambridge International Examinations) system. The main subjects are: Mathematics, English, History, Combined Science, Physics, Biology, French, Latin, Classics. Other subjects such as music, home economics, physical education, computer studies, etc. are offered to broaden the school's educational scope.

Catholic Religion classes  are greatly emphasised—and include Catholic Doctrine and Morality, Catholic Church History, Catholic Apologetics and Scripture.

References

Schools in Whanganui
Cambridge schools in New Zealand
Buildings and structures of the Society of Saint Pius X
Dominican schools in New Zealand
Educational institutions established in 1994
1994 establishments in New Zealand
Secondary schools in Manawatū-Whanganui